Norman Cross ( – August 14, 1990) was a Canadian multihull sailboat designer.

Career
A design engineer by profession, Cross worked for Ford Motor Company, then spent 16 years with General Dynamics' Convair Division in their department of wind-tunnel model design and towing basin testing. He spent much of his life in San Diego, California, beginning to design multihulls in the 1950s, starting with catamarans. His full-time multihull development work began in 1968.

Designs
Cross was responsible for at least the following designs:
Cross 10.5
Cross 18
Cross 24 (1963) and later Cross 24 MkII
Cross 26 (1960s or before) and later Cross 26 MkII
Cross 27 ("stretched Cross 26 MkII")
Cross 28
Cross 30
Cross 31 and later Cross 31 MkII
Cross 32R
Cross 34 and later Cross 34 MkII
Cross 34R ("stretched Cross 32R")
Cross 35
Cross 36
Cross 36R
Cross 37
Cross 38 (1985)
Cross 39
Cross 39R ("stretched Cross 36R")
Cross 39RC
Cross 40RC
Cross 40
Cross 40R
Cross 42 and later Cross 42 MkII
Cross 44 ("stretched Cross42 MkII")
Cross 45R
Cross 46 and later Cross 46 MkII
Cross 48 Model-B
Cross 49
Cross 50
Cross 52
Cross 52R
Cross 78R (late 1980s)

References

Multihull designers
Canadian designers
20th-century Canadian engineers
1910s births
1990 deaths